The 1920–21 season was the Sphas' 4th season in the American League of Philadelphia. Game-by-game records are not available for this season.

References

Philadelphia Sphas seasons